Zhidelevo is a rural locality (a village) in Nikolskoye Rural Settlement, Kaduysky District, Vologda Oblast, Russia. The population was 8 as of 2002.

Geography 
Zhidelevo is located 65 km north of Kaduy (the district's administrative centre) by road. Krasnaya Zarya is the nearest rural locality.

References 

Rural localities in Kaduysky District